Viktor Vladimirovich Yartsev (1904, Moscow, Russian Empire – 1940, Moscow, Soviet Union) was the Head of the Department of Water Transport, Highways and Communications (11th Department) of the People's Commissariat of Internal Affairs of the Soviet Union, then First Deputy People's Commissar of Communications of the Soviet Union, Major of State Security (1937).

Biography
In 1918–1919, he was an apprentice in a hairdressing salon, in 1919–1920, he was an assistant locksmith in auto repair shops. In May 1920, he entered the Workers' and Peasants' Red Army and in the same year joined the Russian Communist Party (Bolsheviks). In May–September 1921, he was an instructor of the Moscow Committee of the Russian Communist Youth Union; from October 1922, he worked at the Mosselprom trust, then at Soyuzselprom.

In February 1930, he joined the United State Political Administration. From March 1930, assistant commissioner, from June 1, 1930, commissioner, from October 1, 1931, operational commissioner of the Economic Directorate of the United State Political Administration. From October 1, 1933, Assistant Chief of the First Department of the Economic Directorate of the United State Political Directorate (Main Directorate of State Security of the People's Commissariat of Internal Affairs of the Soviet Union). From May 3, 1935, Head of the Second Branch of the Economic Department of the Main Directorate of State Security of the People's Commissariat of Internal Affairs of the Soviet Union. Since November 1936, Head of the First Section (Third) of the Counterintelligence Department of the Main Directorate of State Security of the People's Commissariat of Internal Affairs of the Soviet Union.

One of the closest associates of Nikolai Yezhov, took an active part in the repressions against both the commanding staff of the Workers' and Peasants' Red Army, and against economic assets (primarily at the enterprises of communications). From July 11, 1937, the Head of the Eleventh Department of the Main Directorate of State Security of the People's Commissariat of Internal Affairs of the Soviet Union, in charge of water and road transport, as well as communications. On April 2, 1938, he was sent to Sakhalin with the rank of government commissar. He began mass arrests among the party and economic activists of the island. On July 11, 1938, he was in a plane crash and was wounded.

On November 16, 1938, he was appointed First Deputy People's Commissar of Communications of the Soviet Union. In 1939–1941, he was a candidate member of the Central Committee of the All–Union Communist Party (Bolsheviks), but in June 1939, he was arrested. Sentenced on January 28, 1940, by the Military Collegium of the Supreme Court of the Soviet Union to death. Shot on the day of sentencing.

Education
From September 1921 to October 1922, he studied at the Military School Named After the All–Russian Central Executive Committee;
Until 1926, he was a student of the working faculty (completed 2 courses);
In 1930, he graduated from the Moscow Electrotechnical Institute of Communications.

Ranks
December 11, 1935 – Senior Lieutenant of State Security;
December 20, 1936 – Captain of State Security;
June 27, 1937 – Major of State Security.

Awards
May 5, 1937 – Order of Lenin.

Sources
Nikita Petrov, Konstantin Skorkin. "Who Led the People's Commissariat of Internal Affairs, 1934–1941". Directory. Zvenya Publishing House, 1999,

References

External links
Handbook of the History of the Communist Party and the Soviet Union (1898–1991)
People and Books

1904 births
1940 deaths
Recipients of the Order of Lenin
Soviet intelligence agencies
Central Committee of the Communist Party of the Soviet Union candidate members
Majors of State Security
Great Purge victims
Members of the Communist Party of the Soviet Union executed by the Soviet Union